Matt Rogerson (born 29 June 1993) is an English professional rugby union player. He currently captains London Irish in Premiership Rugby, the top flight of English rugby.

Professional career 
Matt Rogerson signed his first professional contract with Sale Sharks in 2015. He then moved to the Jersey Reds for the 2017/2018 season in the RFU Championship.

After a successful year at the Reds he moved to London Irish for the 2018/2019 season. In November 20, 2019, Rogerson made his premiership debut against Wasps RFC.

Currently playing in the Gallagher Premiership side London Irish, he plays as a flanker or Number 8. Rogerson was named co-captain for London Irish for the 2020/2021 season. 

Rogerson made his 50th appearance in the opening game of the 2020/21 season against Worcester Warriors as captain.

Matt Rogerson has been made club captain for the 2021/22 season for London Irish going on to lead the side to their first appearance in the Heineken Champions Cup for the first time in a decade after an eighth-placed finish in the Gallagher Premiership That year, he made 193 successful tackles (23rd overall in the Premiership) and 380 attacking ruck arrivals (seventh overall in the Premiership). Rogerson was also in the top five of ball carries (152) with the third-most carry metres into contact at the Club (681), with his 19 tackle breaks only bettered in the back-row by new signing Tom Pearson (26). His 380 attacking ruck arrivals that term was only beaten by Rob Simmons (383) at London Irish.

Rogerson has retained his role as club captain for the 2022/23 season for London Irish with Adam Coleman, Rob Simmons and Paddy Jackson as part of the leadership group. 

Matt collected his 100th cap for London Irish Vs Newcastle on Saturday 3rd December 2022 with the game finishing 39-17 to Irish.

References

External links 
 Matt Rogerson
 Matt Rogerson - Player statistics - It's rugby

Living people
1993 births
London Irish players
Sale Sharks players
Jersey Reds players
Rugby union players from Lancaster